Kepler-223 (KOI-730, KIC 10227020) is a G5V star with an extrasolar planetary system discovered by the Kepler mission. Studies indicate that the Kepler-223 star system consists of 4 planets orbiting the star.

Planetary system

The confirmed planetary system was first detected by the Kepler mission, and contains four planets. This system was initially believed to contain two co-orbital planets orbiting the star at approximately the same orbital distance every 9.8 days, with one permanently locked 60° behind the other in one of the two Trojan Lagrangian points. The two co-orbital planets were thought to be locked in mean motion resonances with the other two planets, creating an overall 6:4:4:3 resonance. This would have been the first known example of co-orbital planets.

However follow-up study of the system revealed that an alternative configuration, with the four planets having orbital periods in the ratio 8:6:4:3 is better supported by the data. This configuration does not contain co-orbital planets, and has been confirmed by further observations. It represents the first confirmed 4-body orbital resonance.

The radii are 3.0, 3.4, 5.2, and 4.6 Earth radii, and the orbital periods are 7.3845, 9.8456, 14.7887 and 19.7257 days, respectively.

See also
Kepler-533

References

External links
 "Planetary System KOI-730 Exhibiting a Pair of Co-Orbital Planets" (this site requires a browser with support for WebGL)
 2MASS Catalog Retrieval

Planetary systems with four confirmed planets
G-type subgiants
730
Cygnus (constellation)
J195316.40+471646.1
Planetary transit variables